Leptostylopsis terraecolor is a species of flat-faced longhorn in the beetle family Cerambycidae. It is found in North America.

References

Further reading

External links

 

Acanthocinini
Articles created by Qbugbot
Beetles described in 1880